The 2014–15 Saint Joseph's Hawks women's basketball team will represent the Saint Joseph's University during the 2014–15 college basketball season. Cindy Griffin assumes the responsibility as head coach for her fourteenth season. The Hawks were members of the Atlantic 10 Conference and play their home games at the Hagan Arena. They finished the season 13–17, 8–8 in A-10 play to finish in a tie for sixth place. They advanced to the quarterfinals of the A-10 women's tournament where they lost to Dayton.

2014–15 media
All non-televised Hawks home games will air on the A-10 Digital Network. All Hawks games will be streamed via the Saint Joseph's Sports Network on sjuhawks.com.

2014–15 Roster

Schedule

|-
!colspan=9 style="background:#FFFFFF; color:#990000;"| Regular Season

|-
!colspan=9 style="background:#990000; color:#FFFFFF;"| Atlantic 10 Tournament

Rankings
2014–15 NCAA Division I women's basketball rankings

See also
 2014–15 Saint Joseph's Hawks men's basketball team
 Saint Joseph's Hawks women's basketball

References

Saint Joseph's Hawks women's basketball seasons
Saint Joseph's